Lasigovci is a settlement in the Slovene Hills in the Municipality of Dornava in northeastern Slovenia. The area is part of the traditional region of Styria and is now included with the rest of the municipality in the Drava Statistical Region.

References

External links
Lasigovci on Geopedia

Populated places in the Municipality of Dornava